Pipe Gate was a railway station on the North Staffordshire Railway's Stoke to Market Drayton Line.

Construction
Construction was started on the Newcastle-under-Lyme to Silverdale Junction line on 29 July 1864, and the first train ran on 1 February 1870.

The station served the hamlet of Pipe Gate, which is part of the parish of Woore, Shropshire. It was hence named Pipe Gate (for Woore). On grouping in 1923 it was absorbed into the London Midland and Scottish Railway.

Passenger services
The early years of the 20th century were the busiest, there being thirteen trains daily from Stoke to Silverdale and five to Market Drayton. Railmotor services began in 1905, intended to compete with trams and were somewhat successful in this respect, although they only lasted until 1926.  The station also serviced Woore Racecourse which opened at Pipe Gate in 1885.

The section between Silverdale and Pipe Gate was reduced to single track in October 1934. Dwindling passenger numbers after World War II meant that there were only two trains daily from Stoke to Market Drayton, and all passenger services ceased on 7 May 1956.

Freight traffic
Express Dairies had a creamery with private siding access to the station, allowing its preferred transport partner the GWR to provide milk trains to the facility, for onward scheduling to London. In 1962 a new "chord" line was opened at Madeley to provide a connection to the West Coast Main Line. This was used as a diversionary route when the Harecastle diversion line was being constructed and continued in use for freight workings once the latter was completed. After the closure of the creamery in Spring 1965, the route between Market Drayton and Madeley Chord closed under the Beeching Axe in 1966.

Today
A large amount of rail still exists to the eastern edge of the former and now demolished station, running back towards Silverdale.

References

Further reading

Former North Staffordshire Railway stations
Railway stations in Great Britain opened in 1870
Railway stations in Great Britain closed in 1956
Disused railway stations in Shropshire